Cerro Castillo Dynevor, also known as Castillo Dynevor is located on the northwest coast of Skyring Sound, in Magallanes Region, Chile. It is named after its resemblance with Dynevor Castle in Wales, which was noticed by British explorers in 1830.

Its access is quite harsh due to the nature that all roads end about 30 km from it, and the rest of the way must be done either on a 4x4 vehicle, motorcycle, horse or on foot, either way the appropriate track is just by the shore, not through the woods, as they are too dense.

The ascent is initially blocked by Ñirres (Nothofagus antarctica), which makes advance extremely slow. Following the wooden zone, vast masses of peat moss come across and, the final part is a mix between loosen rocks, snow and ice.

This place is nowadays part of María Consuelo Estancia.

Dynevor
Mountains of Magallanes Region